Rajan Menon (born 1953) is a political scientist.  He holds the Anne and Bernard Spitzer Chair in Political Science at the City University of New York.

Books
Soviet power and the Third World Yale University Press, 1986.
Limits to Soviet power,  Lexington Books, 1989.
Russia, the Caucasus, and Central Asia : the 21st century security environment, M.E. Sharpe, 1999.
Energy and conflict in Central Asia and the Caucasus, Rowman & Littlefield Publishers, 2000.
The end of alliances Oxford University Press, 2007.
Conflict in Ukraine; The Unwinding of the Post–Cold War Order with Eugene B. Rumer, The MIT Press, 2015.
The conceit of humanitarian intervention, Oxford University Press, 2016.

References

American political scientists
National Bureau of Asian Research
Living people
1953 births